Arundel House was a London town-house or palace located between the Strand and the River Thames, near the Church of St Clement Danes.

History
During the Middle Ages it was the town house of the Bishops of Bath and Wells, when it was known as "Bath Inn", similarly to other grand London town-houses such as Lincoln's Inn, Gray's Inn, etc.  In 1539 at the Dissolution of the Monasteries it was granted by King Henry VIII to William Fitzwilliam, Earl of Southampton.

It reverted to the Crown on Fitzwilliam's death and in 1545 was re-granted by King Henry VIII to Thomas Seymour, 1st Baron Seymour of Sudeley, a younger brother of Queen Jane Seymour, the king's  third wife and younger brother of Edward Seymour, 1st Duke of Somerset, Lord Protector, uncle of the infant King Edward VI. After Thomas Seymour's execution in 1549 for treason, the house was sold to Henry Fitz Alan, 12th Earl of Arundel, for about £40.

It was later inherited by marriage by the Howard family and housed the "Arundel Marbles", the famous sculpture collection of Thomas Howard, 2nd/21st Earl of Arundel, 4th Earl of Surrey, 1st Earl of Norfolk (1585–1646), most of which is now in the Ashmolean Museum in Oxford, although a 2nd-century AD relief from Ephesus kept at the house may be seen in the 17th century gallery at the Museum of London. During the late 1620s and early 1630s, the mathematician William Oughtred had a room at Arundel House, where he instructed the Earl's son and gave direction to other mathematicians. The house also hosted the Earl's protégé, the artist and topographer Wenceslaus Hollar. The Royal Society held its meetings there during the late 1660s.

Around the year 1618 the court architect Inigo Jones designed an Italianate gateway for Arundel House, and probably a wing known from the view by Cornelius Bol, and the building with dormer windows seen in Hollar's engraving,

Under the ancient name "Bath Inn" it housed Henry Percy, 9th Earl of Northumberland, after his release from the Tower of London in 1621. The 17th-century Arundel House was demolished, and is commemorated by Arundel Street and Surrey Street. The present late 19th-century Tudor Revival Arundel House, at the foot of Arundel Street on the corner of Temple Place, is a conference centre which now serves as the headquarters of the International Institute for Strategic Studies.

The Roman Baths, Strand Lane were situated within the grounds, and are in the ownership of the National Trust.

According to The Oxford Dictionary of Music (1994), the first performance of Thomas Tallis's forty-part motet, Spem in alium, probably took place in the Long Gallery of Arundel House in 1568 or 1569.

References

Walford, Edward.  Old London: Strand to Soho.  London:  The Alderman Press, 1987.  Orig. publ. 1878.  
Ben Weinreb, and Christopher Hibbert, eds.  The London Encyclopædia.  2nd edition (1st ed. 1983).  London: Macmillan, 1992.

External links
Arundel House article from The Map of Early Modern London project at The University of Victoria
Hollar's etchings of Arundel House from the North and South, plus the 1647 view of the City from the top of Arundel House
Account of Arundel House, with plan of Arundel and Essex Houses

Episcopal palaces in London
Former houses in the City of Westminster
Strand, London